Kazi Kader Newaj (1909–1983) was a Bangladeshi poet. He won Bangla Academy Literary Award in 1963.

Education and career
Newaj earned his BA Honours in English from Berhampore College in 1927 and his master's degree from  University of Calcutta in 1929.

Newaj published books of poems including Maral (1936), Dadur Baithak (1947), Nil Kumudi (1960), Duti Pakhi Duti Tara (1966), Manidvip, Utala Sandhya, Kaler Hawa, and Maruchandrika.

Awards

 President's Award
 Bangla Academy Literary Award
 Madar Baksh Award

References

1909 births
1983 deaths
20th-century Bangladeshi poets
Recipients of Bangla Academy Award
Bangladeshi male poets
Date of birth missing
Date of death missing
People from Bardhaman
University of Calcutta alumni
20th-century male writers
Poets from West Bengal